The USASA National Women's Open is an American women's soccer tournament run by the United States Adult Soccer Association.  It began in 1996, and from 2009 to 2012 it was known as the Women's Cup.  Before the formation of the Women's Open, the Women's Amateur was the top national cup competition.

Historically, it has only been contested by amateur and semi-pro teams, as teams from professional leagues (WUSA, WPS, and the NWSL) are not allowed to enter the competition. In 2012 though, the Chicago Red Stars, a professional club in the WPSL Elite, entered and won the competition.  Similarly, the professional Houston Aces of WPSL won in 2013.

The defending Women's Cup champions are Olympic Club, who won the title over the ASA Chesapeake Charge after beating the Charge 2–0 in the final game day of the 2015 round robin group.  Olympic Club also won the 2014 Women's Amateur.

Tournament Structure

2009–2012

In the regional phase of the competition, four to sixteen teams per region compete in a round-robin (or partial round-robin) tournament, playing at least three games.

The national finals feature the four regional winners in a two-round knockout tournament.

2013–present

Teams apply to take part in the national championships, which is contested as an initial round-robin group, followed by a championship game if there are more than four teams participating.

Finalists

 Notes
 Sources disagree on winner
 Losing finalist and semifinalists unknown
 All semifinalists known but results are not
 Event contested as round-robin group

References

External links
 USASA home page

  

 
Women's soccer cup competitions in the United States